Darius Šilinskis (born May 18, 1984, in Mažeikiai, Lithuania) is a former professional Lithuanian basketball center, who last played for NKL's JAZZ-Diremta. He is 2.16 m tall and weights 118 kg. In his early professional career he had couple stints with Žalgiris Kaunas.

Achievements
LKL Champion - 2003, 2007
LKF Cup Winner - 2007

References
, FIBA Europe.

Lithuanian men's basketball players
Living people
1984 births
BC Valga players
BC Nevėžis players
Centers (basketball)
Lithuanian expatriate basketball people in Estonia
People from Mažeikiai